May Britt Nilsen (born 9 April 1958) is a Norwegian former professional racing cyclist. She won the Norwegian National Road Race Championship five times in the 1970s.

References

External links
 

1958 births
Living people
Norwegian female cyclists
Place of birth missing (living people)